Kuşadası is a large resort town on Turkey's Aegean coast, and the center of the seaside district of the same name within Aydın Province. The municipality's primary industry is tourism. The mayor of the district is Ömer Günel.

Etymology

The name Kuşadası comes from the Turkish words kuş (bird) and ada (island), as the island has the shape of a bird's head (when seen from the sea). It was known as Ephesus Neopolis during the Byzantine era, and later as Scala Nova or Scala Nuova under the Genoese and Venetians. Kuş Adası was adopted in its place at the beginning of the 20th century. Today, the citizens of Kuşadası often shorten the town's name to Ada.

History

Antiquity

The area has been a centre of art and culture since some of the earliest recorded history, and has been settled by many civilizations since being founded by the Leleges people in 3000 BC. Later settlers include the Aeolians in the 11th century BC and Ionians in the 9th. Originally, seamen and traders built a number of settlements along the coastline, including Neopolis.

An outpost of Ephesus in ancient Ionia, known as Pygela (Πύγελα) was located in the area between the Büyük Menderes (Maeander) and Gediz (Hermos) rivers. The original Neopolis, is thought to have been founded on the nearby point of Yılancı Burnu. Later settlements were probably built on the hillside of Pilavtepe, in the district called Andızkulesi today. Kuşadası was a minor port frequented by vessels trading along the Aegean coast. In antiquity it was overshadowed by Ephesus, until Ephesus' harbor silted up. From the 7th century BC onwards the coast was ruled by Lydians from their capital at Sardis, then from 546 BC the Persians, and from 334 BC, along with all of Anatolia, the coast was conquered by Alexander the Great. From that point on the coastal cities in Anatolia became a centre of Hellenistic culture.

Rome and Christianity
The Roman Empire took possession of the coast in the 2nd century BC and made it their provincial capital in the early years of Christianity.  Saint John the Evangelist and (according to Roman Catholic sacred tradition) the Virgin Mary both came to live in the area, which in the Christian era became known as "Ania".

As Byzantine, Venetian and Genoese shippers began to trade along the coast, the port was re-founded (by the name of Scala Nova or Scala Nuova, meaning "New Port"), a garrison was placed on the island, and the town centre shifted from the hillside to the coast.

The Turkish era

Long afterwards, in 1834, the castle and garrison on the island were rebuilt and expanded, becoming the focus of the town. This was to such an extent that people began to refer to the whole town as Kuşadası (bird island).  However, in the 19th century, trade began to decline in favor of other nearby cities with the opening of the İzmir-Selçuk-Aydın railway, which bypassed Kuşadası. From 1867 until 1922, Kuşadası was part of Aidin Vilayet.

During the Turkish War of Independence, Kuşadası was occupied from 1919-1922, first by Italian troops between 14 May 1919 and 24 May 1922, and then by Greek troops. The Turkish forces eventually gained control of the city on September 7, 1922.

Under the Republic of Turkey, the Greek population was exchanged for Turkish people as part of the population exchange between Greece and Turkey in 1923. It was a district in İzmir Province until its transfer to Aydın Province in 27 June 1957.

Geography

The city is situated along a gulf of the same name in the Aegean. The island of Güvercinada (in English: Pigeon Island) is connected to mainland Kuşadası by a causeway, and is situated adjacent to the large hill of Kese Dağı near the center of town.

Its neighbours are Selçuk to the north, Germencik to the north-east, and Söke to the east and south.

Demographics
The district of Kuşadası had a total residential population of 121,493 in 2020, though the actual population is thought to rise to well over half a million in the summer months due to a significant influx of both domestic and international tourists as well as those visiting family or returning to their summer residence. This also includes the hotel and bar staff, construction workers, and drivers who are required to work in/for the restaurants and other services accommodating these visitors. In addition to tourists from overseas, there is also a substantial community of foreigners that have permanently settled in the area.

Economy

Industry

Kuşadası caters to tourists arriving by land, or from the port for cruise ship passengers heading to Ephesus.  In a controversial deal in 2003, the previously public-owned port was leased to a private company and renovated to attract luxury cruise liners.

The area features several well-known local beaches, including Ladies Beach, the beach at the centrum, the beaches between the Batıhan Hotel and the Nazilli Site, the beach at Güzelçamlı, and the Dilek Peninsula National Park beach, referred to by locals as simply Milli Park.

Transportation

There is public transport within the town and to nearby locations via shuttle minibuses (dolmuş). There are bus and taxi services going to the nearby airports in İzmir and in Bodrum, Muğla Province. Day trips are available by boat from Kuşadası and Güzelçamlı.

The city is a port of call for several cruise ships.

The port is linked by a six-lane highway to İzmir's Adnan Menderes Airport.

Several state roads connect the city to its surrounding districts, such as Germencik and Aydın.

There are daily ferry services to the nearby Greek island of Samos.

Kuşadası's bus station is a transport hub. Coach buses connect the city to various parts of the country.

Places of interest

 The city walls – There were once three gates; one remains.
 Kaleiçi Mosque – Built in 1618 by Grand Vizier Öküz Kara Mehmed Pasha.
 The Öküz Mehmed Pasha Caravanserai is near the docks. It was built in 1618 as a strong-room for the goods of seamen.
 Güvercin Adası ("Pigeon Island" in English) – The peninsula/island at the end of the bay, which has a castle and swimming beaches, including a private beach and cafe with a view back across the bay to the harbour of Kuşadası. Public beaches are located at the back of the peninsula, towards the open sea.
 Kirazli – Traditional Turkish village  from Kuşadası.
 Yılancı Burnu – A second peninsula beyond Güvercin Ada. Possibly the location of the original settlement of Neopolis. Some walls are visible. There are beaches and beach clubs here.
 Several aqua-parks with wave-pools and white-water slides are located near the town.
 Ladies Beach – Very close to the town center, one of the primary tourist attractions.
 Kadıkalesi – Venetian/Byzantine castle,  along the Kuşadası-Davutlar road.
Once the central meeting place of the Ionian League. The ruins are in poor condition and their authenticity is disputed.
It has several coves, beaches, canyons, and a sink cave. It is one of the most diverse and protected national parks in Turkey.

Culture

 An annual song contest has been held here. It was once won by Cem Karaca.
 The annual Fanta Gençlik Festivali (Fanta Youth Festival), hosted by the Turkish franchise of Fanta (see International availability of Fanta), travels across the country on specific dates, holding concerts at each location. On July 17, 2010, the festival hosted one of the concerts of this festival in Kuşadası.
 The Kuşadası Gençlik Festivali (Kuşadası Youth Festival, not to be confused with the above) has been hosted annually since 2016 at Sevgi Plajı (Love Beach), one of the main beaches situated on the coast of the district's Davutlar locality – roughly a  drive south from central Kuşadası, serviced regularly by dolmuş departing from the city. Facilitated each year in July over the course of five days with a total of over 30 artists performing, the festival saw an estimated turnout of about 90,000 people in its 2017 iteration according to its promoters. Since its inception, it has continuously grown in popularity and has become among the most regarded music festivals in Turkey.

Sports
The football teams of the local sports clubs Kuşadasıspor and Kuşadası Yıldız Fenerspor, which compete in the Turkish Regional Amateur League, play their home matches in the Özer Türk Stadium.

International relations

Twin towns - sister cities
Kuşadası is twinned with:

 Batumi, Georgia
 Bihać, Bosnia and Herzegovina
 Cherkasy, Ukraine
 Drogheda, Ireland
 Gjorče Petrov (Skopje), North Macedonia
 Marl, Germany
 El Mina, Lebanon
 Monterey, United States

 Prizren, Kosovo
 Sinaia, Romania
 Vathy, Greece

See also
 Blue Cruise
 Foreign purchases of real estate in Turkey
 Güzelçamlı
 Marinas in Turkey
 Turkish Riviera

References

External links

 Kusadasi Information
 Kusadasi Guide

 
Populated places in Aydın Province
Populated coastal places in Turkey
Seaside resorts in Turkey
Aegean Sea port cities and towns in Turkey
Tourist attractions in Aydın Province
Fishing communities in Turkey
Towns in Turkey